Richard Eric Pattis is an American professor at the University of California, Irvine's Donald Bren School of Information and Computer Sciences, where he taught introductory programming and data structures.

He is the author of the Karel programming language, and published Karel the Robot: A gentle introduction to the art of programming.

Pattis has been a professor of computer science at Carnegie Mellon University and the University of Washington. He holds a master's degree from Stanford University.

References

External links
 

Living people
University of California, Irvine faculty
Computer science educators
Year of birth missing (living people)